The Kennedy Center Honors are annual honors given to those in the performing arts for their lifetime of contributions to American culture. They have been presented annually since 1978, culminating each December in a gala celebrating five honorees in the Kennedy Center Opera House in Washington, D.C.  While the awards are primarily given to individuals, they have occasionally been given to couples or musical groups, as well as to one Broadway musical and one television show.

History
George Stevens Jr. created the Kennedy Center Honors with Nick Vanoff and produced the first gala in 1978. He was the producer and co-writer through the 2014 awards, after which he sold the production rights to the Kennedy Center.

The Kennedy Center Honors started in 1977, after that year's 10th-anniversary White House reception and Kennedy Center program for the American Film Institute (AFI). Roger L. Stevens, the founding chairman of the Kennedy Center, asked George Stevens Jr. (no relation), the founding director of the AFI, to hold an event for the center. Stevens Jr. asked Isaac Stern to become involved, and then pitched the idea to the television network CBS, who bought it. With the first honors event and honorees, CBS vice president for specials, Bernie Sofronski, stated:

The first host was Leonard Bernstein in 1978, followed by Eric Sevareid in 1979 (with Gene Kelly closing it) and Beverly Sills in 1980. Walter Cronkite hosted from 1981 to 2002 and Caroline Kennedy hosted from 2003 to 2012. Glenn Close hosted in 2013 and Stephen Colbert hosted from 2014 to 2016. Ricky Kirshner and Glenn Weiss of White Cherry Entertainment were the Executive Producers of the 38th annual Kennedy Center Honors (2015) after George Stevens Jr. stepped down. There was no formal host in 2017, although Caroline Kennedy delivered an introduction. In 2018 and mid-2021, Gloria Estefan hosted, LL Cool J hosted in 2019, and David Letterman hosted in late 2021. There was no formal host in 2022, though several former honorees delivered an introduction.

This awards show does not air live (with the exception of closed-circuit venues), but an edited version lasting approximately two hours is normally televised on CBS after Christmas. Normally, the show has been aired between Christmas and New Year's on CBS television, but, in a departure from this tradition, the 2019 Kennedy Center Honors aired on regular television in early December and was later made available on CBS All Access. Due to the COVID-19 pandemic, the 2020 edition was postponed and eventually held between May 17 and May 22, 2021, and the edited broadcast aired on June 6, 2021.

Selection process
Honoree recommendations are accepted from the general public, and the Kennedy Center initiated a Special Honors Advisory Committee, which comprises two members of the board of trustees as well as past honorees and distinguished artists. The executive committee of the board of trustees selects the honoree recipients based on excellence in music, dance, theater, opera, motion pictures or television. The selections are typically announced sometime between July and September.

Events
The invitation-only, weekend-long ceremony includes the Chairman's Luncheon, the State Department dinner, White House reception, and the Honors gala performances and supper.

The Chairman's Luncheon is held on Saturday at the Kennedy Center. Surrounded by the Honorees, the chairman of the board of trustees launches the event with a welcoming speech. At that evening's reception and dinner at the State Department, presided over by the Secretary of State, the Honorees are introduced and the Honors medallions are presented by the chairman of the board. The wide rainbow-colored ribbon then hung around the necks of the recipients and prominently noticeable when the events are televised, symbolizes "a spectrum of many skills within the performing arts" according to creator Ivan Chermayeff.

On Sunday, there is an early-evening White House reception, traditionally hosted by the President of the United States and the First Lady, followed by the Honors gala performance at the Kennedy Center and supper.

Prior to 2017, there had been three occasions in which the president did not attend the gala performance.  President Jimmy Carter did not attend in 1979 during the Iran hostage crisis; First Lady Rosalynn Carter served as his surrogate. President George H. W. Bush was on a trip to Brussels and could not attend in 1989; First Lady Barbara Bush served as his surrogate. President Bill Clinton was on a trip to Budapest and could not attend in 1994; First Lady Hillary Rodham Clinton served as his surrogate.

For the 2015 gala performance, President Barack Obama joined First Lady Michelle Obama late after addressing the nation in a live telecast from the White House.

In 2017, President Donald Trump and First Lady Melania Trump decided not to participate in events honoring recipients of the 2017 Kennedy Center Honors awards to "allow the honorees to celebrate without any political distraction." The 2017 ceremony was held on December 3, 2017 without them, marking the first time that neither the president nor the first lady attended; Caroline Kennedy was the host and presented the honorees. The traditional dinner at the State Department on the Saturday evening before the ceremony was hosted by Secretary of State Rex Tillerson, and the White House reception was canceled. Donald and Melania Trump also did not participate in any of the events of the 2018 or 2019 editions.

Because of changes imposed on the delayed and abbreviated 2020 edition due to the COVID-19 pandemic, President Joe Biden and First Lady Jill Biden welcomed that year's Honorees to the White House in May of 2021 but did not attend any other events.

For the 2021 edition, Joe and Jill Biden attended the gala performance on December 5, 2021, marking the first time since 2016 that a sitting president and first lady had attended the event.

Recipients

Two hundred forty-eight Kennedy Center Honors have been awarded as of 2022. One award, given to stand-up comedian and actor Bill Cosby in 1998, was rescinded in 2018, following a sexual assault conviction. The vast majority have been bestowed on individuals. On twelve occasions since 1985, awards have been presented to duos or groups, including three married couples who were actors: Hume Cronyn and Jessica Tandy; Paul Newman and Joanne Woodward; and Ossie Davis and Ruby Dee. Dancers The Nicholas Brothers, Fayard and Harold were honored, along with three musical theater songwriting duos: Alan Jay Lerner and Frederick Loewe, Betty Comden and Adolph Green, and John Kander and Fred Ebb. Members of five music groups were awarded: Pete Townshend and Roger Daltrey of The Who; John Paul Jones, Jimmy Page and Robert Plant of Led Zeppelin; Don Henley, Timothy B. Schmit, Joe Walsh and (posthumously) Glenn Frey of the Eagles; Philip Bailey, Verdine White, Ralph Johnson and (posthumously) Maurice White of Earth, Wind & Fire; and Bono, The Edge, Adam Clayton, and Larry Mullen Jr. of U2.

In 2018, the award for "trailblazing creators of a transformative work that defies category" was created and presented at the annual ceremony to the creators of the musical Hamilton: Lin-Manuel Miranda, Thomas Kail, Andy Blankenbuehler and Alex Lacamoire.

The 2019 honorees included, for the first time, a television program; the co-founders of Sesame Street, Joan Ganz Cooney and Lloyd Morrisett, accepted the Kennedy Center Honors on behalf of all of the creators.

1970s
 1978 – Marian Anderson, Fred Astaire, George Balanchine, Richard Rodgers, and Arthur Rubinstein
 1979 – Aaron Copland, Ella Fitzgerald, Henry Fonda, Martha Graham, and Tennessee Williams

1980s
 1980 – Leonard Bernstein, James Cagney, Agnes de Mille, Lynn Fontanne, and Leontyne Price
 1981 – Count Basie, Cary Grant, Helen Hayes, Jerome Robbins, and Rudolf Serkin
 1982 – George Abbott, Lillian Gish, Benny Goodman, Gene Kelly, and Eugene Ormandy
 1983 – Katherine Dunham, Elia Kazan, Frank Sinatra, James Stewart, and Virgil Thomson
 1984 – Lena Horne, Danny Kaye, Gian Carlo Menotti, Arthur Miller, and Isaac Stern
 1985 – Merce Cunningham, Irene Dunne, Bob Hope, Alan Jay Lerner and Frederick Loewe, and Beverly Sills
 1986 – Lucille Ball, Ray Charles, Hume Cronyn and Jessica Tandy, Yehudi Menuhin, and Antony Tudor
 1987 – Perry Como, Bette Davis, Sammy Davis Jr., Nathan Milstein, and Alwin Nikolais
 1988 – Alvin Ailey, George Burns, Myrna Loy, Alexander Schneider, and Roger L. Stevens
 1989 – Harry Belafonte, Claudette Colbert, Alexandra Danilova, Mary Martin, and William Schuman

1990s
 1990 – Dizzy Gillespie, Katharine Hepburn, Risë Stevens, Jule Styne, and Billy Wilder
 1991 – Roy Acuff, Betty Comden and Adolph Green, Fayard and Harold Nicholas, Gregory Peck, and Robert Shaw
 1992 – Lionel Hampton, Paul Newman and Joanne Woodward, Ginger Rogers, Mstislav Rostropovich, and Paul Taylor
 1993 – Johnny Carson, Arthur Mitchell, Georg Solti, Stephen Sondheim, and Marion Williams
 1994 – Kirk Douglas, Aretha Franklin, Morton Gould, Harold Prince, and Pete Seeger
 1995 – Jacques d'Amboise, Marilyn Horne, B.B. King, Sidney Poitier, and Neil Simon
 1996 – Edward Albee, Benny Carter, Johnny Cash, Jack Lemmon, and Maria Tallchief
 1997 – Lauren Bacall, Bob Dylan, Charlton Heston, Jessye Norman, and Edward Villella
 1998 – Fred Ebb and John Kander, Willie Nelson, André Previn, and Shirley Temple Black (while Bill Cosby was recognized this year, the honor was rescinded in 2018 following a sexual assault conviction)
 1999 – Victor Borge, Sean Connery, Judith Jamison, Jason Robards, and Stevie Wonder

2000s

 2000 – Mikhail Baryshnikov, Chuck Berry, Plácido Domingo, Clint Eastwood, and Angela Lansbury
 2001 – Julie Andrews, Van Cliburn, Quincy Jones, Jack Nicholson, and Luciano Pavarotti
 2002 – James Earl Jones, James Levine, Chita Rivera, Paul Simon, and Elizabeth Taylor
 2003 – James Brown, Carol Burnett, Loretta Lynn, Mike Nichols, and Itzhak Perlman
 2004 – Warren Beatty, Ossie Davis and Ruby Dee, Elton John, Joan Sutherland, and John Williams
 2005 – Tony Bennett, Suzanne Farrell, Julie Harris, Robert Redford, and Tina Turner
 2006 – Andrew Lloyd Webber, Zubin Mehta, Dolly Parton, Smokey Robinson, and Steven Spielberg
 2007 – Leon Fleisher, Steve Martin, Diana Ross, Martin Scorsese, and Brian Wilson
 2008 – Morgan Freeman, George Jones, Barbra Streisand, Twyla Tharp, and The Who (Pete Townshend and Roger Daltrey)
 2009 – Mel Brooks, Dave Brubeck, Grace Bumbry, Robert De Niro, and Bruce Springsteen

2010s
 
 2010 – Merle Haggard, Jerry Herman, Bill T. Jones, Paul McCartney, and Oprah Winfrey
 2011 – Barbara Cook, Neil Diamond, Yo-Yo Ma, Sonny Rollins, and Meryl Streep
 2012 – Buddy Guy, Dustin Hoffman, David Letterman, Natalia Makarova, and Led Zeppelin (John Paul Jones, Jimmy Page and  Robert Plant)
 2013 – Martina Arroyo, Herbie Hancock, Billy Joel, Shirley MacLaine, and Carlos Santana
 2014 – Al Green, Tom Hanks, Patricia McBride, Sting, and Lily Tomlin
 2015 – Carole King, George Lucas, Rita Moreno, Seiji Ozawa, and Cicely Tyson
 2016 – Martha Argerich, Eagles (Don Henley, Glenn Frey, Timothy B. Schmit, Joe Walsh), Al Pacino, Mavis Staples, and James Taylor
 2017 – Carmen de Lavallade, Gloria Estefan, LL Cool J, Norman Lear, and Lionel Richie
 2018 – Cher, Philip Glass, Reba McEntire, Wayne Shorter, and the creators of Hamilton: An American Musical (Lin-Manuel Miranda, Thomas Kail, Alex Lacamoire, and Andy Blankenbuehler)
 2019 – Earth, Wind & Fire (Philip Bailey, Verdine White, and Ralph Johnson), Sally Field, Linda Ronstadt, Sesame Street (Lloyd Morrisett and Joan Ganz Cooney), and Michael Tilson Thomas

2020s
 
 2020 – Debbie Allen, Joan Baez, Garth Brooks, Midori, and Dick Van Dyke
 2021 – Justino Díaz, Berry Gordy, Lorne Michaels, Bette Midler, and Joni Mitchell
 2022 – George Clooney, Amy Grant, Gladys Knight, Tania León, and U2 (Bono, The Edge, Adam Clayton and Larry Mullen Jr.)

Prospective honorees who declined, canceled or postponed
Pianist Vladimir Horowitz was to be an honoree, but the selection committee withdrew the offer when Horowitz conditioned his acceptance on being honored alone and at 4 in the afternoon.

Actress Katharine Hepburn declined the committee's first offer, although she relented in 1990.

Doris Day repeatedly turned down the honor because her fear of flying prevented her from attending the ceremony.

When considering Irving Berlin for the 1987 awards because of criticism for overlooking him, the center was informed that Berlin wanted to be honored only if he surpassed his 100th birthday (which would not be until May 1988). Also, he was in failing health, used a wheelchair following a series of strokes and could not attend a public event. The Center chose instead to pay special tribute to him at the 1987 Gala. He died in 1989.

Paul McCartney was selected as an honoree in 2002, but was unable to attend due to an "inescapable personal obligation", his cousin's previously planned wedding. After initially saying that McCartney's award would be postponed until the following year, the Kennedy Center did not award McCartney in 2003. McCartney later became a 2010 honoree.

Mel Brooks has stated that he refused the honor when George W. Bush was in office, due to his distaste for Bush's Iraq policy. He was honored in 2009, the first year Barack Obama was president.

In November 2015, one month before the actual ceremony, the Eagles postponed their honors until the following year because Glenn Frey had intestinal problems that required major surgery and a long recovery period. Despite their absence, they were still honored in 2015 via a performance of "Desperado" by country singer Miranda Lambert. Frey died on January 18, 2016, although the center made him and the three surviving members 2016 honorees.

In 2017, Norman Lear accepted the honor, but boycotted the White House ceremony because of his opposition to President Donald Trump, citing Trump's proposal to end the National Endowments for the Humanities and for the Arts. Lear did attend the 2017 events and ceremony, but Donald and Melania Trump were not present, becoming the first U.S. presidential couple to skip the event, in order "to allow the honorees to celebrate without any political distraction".

See also
 Mark Twain Prize for American Humor, the Kennedy Center's award for contributions to American humor

References

External links

"Collection Kennedy Center Honors" The Paley Center for Media

1978 establishments in Washington, D.C.
Awards established in 1978
Lifetime achievement awards
 
Lists of award winners
Culture of Washington, D.C.
Christmas television specials
Primetime Emmy Award for Outstanding Variety Series winners
American performing arts awards